Agri or Aagri is a dialect of Maharashtrian Konkani which is spoken by members of the Agri (caste). Although it is commonly seen in comedy shows, it is not merely the language of humour but also the distinct dialect closely related to Koli Konkani, and the Aagri people speak it on a day-to-day basis. Until the late 20th century, it was an oral dialect and was passed down from one generation to the next. It is spoken in many cities such as Mumbai (Bombay), Thana (Trombay), Raigad (Colaba), Bhiwandi,  Vasai (Bassein) and Palghar.

References

External links

Akhil Agri Samaj
News Report from Zee 24 Taas about the Agri dialect

Marathi language